The 2022 Centrobasket Women was the 23nd edition of the Centrobasket was held in the city of Chihuahua from 23 to 27 November 2022.

Puerto Rico won their fourth overall title.

The top four teams qualified for the 2023 FIBA Women's AmeriCup.

Group stage

Pool A

Pool B

Final round

All times are local (UTC–6).

Semifinals

Seventh place game

Fifth place game

Third place game

Final

Final standings

References

External links
Official website

Centrobasket Women
2022–23 in North American basketball
2022 in women's basketball
International basketball competitions hosted by Mexico
2022 in Central American sport
2022 in Caribbean sport
November 2022 sports events in Mexico